Iuliana Hobincu (born May 29, 1954) is a former Romanian handball player who competed in the 1976 Summer Olympics.

She was part of the Romanian handball team, which finished fourth in the Olympic tournament. She played three matches and scored three goals.

References

1954 births
Living people
Romanian female handball players 
Olympic handball players of Romania

Handball players at the 1976 Summer Olympics